In enzymology, a fucosylgalactoside 3-alpha-galactosyltransferase is an enzyme that catalyzes the chemical reaction

UDP-galactose + alpha-L-fucosyl-(1->2)-D-galactosyl-R  UDP + alpha-D-galactosyl-(1->3)-[alpha-L-fucosyl(1->2)]-D-galactosyl-R

Thus, the two substrates of this enzyme are UDP-galactose and [[alpha-L-fucosyl-(1->2)-D-galactosyl-R]], whereas its two products are UDP and [[alpha-D-galactosyl-(1->3)-[alpha-L-fucosyl(1->2)]-D-galactosyl-R]].

This enzyme belongs to the family of glycosyltransferases, specifically the hexosyltransferases.  The systematic name of this enzyme class is UDP-galactose:alpha-L-fucosyl-(1->2)-D-galactoside 3-alpha-D-galactosyltransferase. Other names in common use include UDP-galactose:O-alpha-L-fucosyl(1->2)D-galactose, alpha-D-galactosyltransferase, UDPgalactose:glycoprotein-alpha-L-fucosyl-(1,2)-D-galactose, 3-alpha-D-galactosyltransferase, [blood group substance] alpha-galactosyltransferase, blood-group substance B-dependent galactosyltransferase, glycoprotein-fucosylgalactoside alpha-galactosyltransferase, histo-blood group B transferase, and histo-blood substance B-dependent galactosyltransferase.  This enzyme participates in 3 metabolic pathways: glycosphingolipid biosynthesis - lactoseries, glycosphingolipid biosynthesis - neo-lactoseries, and glycan structures - biosynthesis 2.

Structural studies

References

 

EC 2.4.1
Enzymes of known structure